A Desert Hero is a 1919 American short comedy film directed by and starring Fatty Arbuckle. The film is considered to be lost.

Plot
Arbuckle plays a miner who has struck gold.  He comes into a frontier town called Carbolic Camp looking for a good time.  The town is wild and woolly; anybody who takes the job of sheriff is killed within minutes.  Looking to change his gold into cash, Arbuckle enters Hyena Hall, a dancehall run by an enormous bully named Bullneck Bradley.  The locals scheme to steal his gold.  The star dancing girl refuses to be part of the scheme and is thrown out into the street.

Arbuckle gets into a fight with the town bully; when he wins, he is elected sheriff.  He falls in love with the dancing girl, who reforms and joins the Salvation Army.  While the Salvation Army is holding a meeting in front of the dancehall, Arbuckle overhears the dancehall owner making disparaging remarks.  They fight; Arbuckle wins and makes everyone present join the Salvation Army.

Cast

 Roscoe 'Fatty' Arbuckle as The Sheriff, the Desert Hero
 Al St. John as The Bad Man
 Molly Malone as The Young Girl
 Monte Collins as The Old Man
 John Henry Coogan Jr. (credited as John Coogan)
 Alice Lake

See also
 List of American films of 1919
 Fatty Arbuckle filmography

References

External links

1919 films
1919 comedy films
1919 short films
Films directed by Roscoe Arbuckle
American silent short films
American black-and-white films
Silent American comedy films
Films with screenplays by Roscoe Arbuckle
Paramount Pictures films
Lost American films
American comedy short films
1919 lost films
Lost comedy films
1910s American films